is a Japanese singer and actress who starred in numerous Japanese films and Japanese television dramas. and released two solo albums and solo singles in the 1990s, after being part of the Japanese band "Modern Choki Chokies".  She was also part of the Japanese "unit" (temporary band) "Unknown Soup & Spice" in 2003.

Discography

Solo albums
 Futsu no hito (フツーの人) (1995)
 Amu Onna (編む女) (1997) which includes a title with Autechre

Solo singles

 パジャマトリッパー
 フツーで行こう
 ひとひと
 人の息子
 It's My Love/氣愛/Sens

Band albums

With "Modern Choki Chokies":
 Rolling dodoitsu (ローリング・ドドイツ) (1992)
 Bongengan Bangara Bingen no Densetsu (ボンゲンガンバンガラビンゲンの伝説 (1993)
 Moda-Choki (別冊モダチョキ臨時増刊号) (1994)
 Kumachan (くまちゃん) (1994)
 Readymade no Modern Choki Chokies (レディメイドのモダンチョキチョキズ) (1997)

With "Unknown Soup & Spice":
 Chant (2003)

Filmography

Film
Shomuni (1998)
The Cat Returns (2002)
Blood and Bones (2004)
Kiraware Matsuko no Issho (2006)
Hanada Shonen-shi (2006)
Sakai-ke no Shiawase (2006)
The Battery  (2007)
Unfair: The Movie (2007)
Cafe Isobe (2008)
Her Granddaughter (2014)
Maestro! (2015)
14 That Night (2016)
Traces of Sin (2017)
Inuyashiki (2018)
After the Rain (2018), Kayoko Kubo
Real Girl (2018)
Little Nights, Little Love (2018)
Oz Land (2018)
Tora-san, Wish You Were Here (2019)
Little Nights, Little Love (2019)
The Confidence Man JP: Episode of the Princess (2020)
Project Dream: How to Build Mazinger Z's Hangar (2020)
Between Us (2021)
Musicophilia (2021)
The End of the Pale Hour (2022)

Dramas and TV-movies

Koi no Bakansu (NTV, 1997)
Love Again (TBS, 1998)
Oatsui no ga Osuki? (NTV, 1998)
Yoiko no Mikata (NTV, 2003)
Diamond Girl (Fuji TV, 2003)
Shin Yonigeya Honpo (NTV, 2003, ep1)
Kikujiro to Saki (TV Asahi, 2003)
Ranpo R Kyuketsuki (NTV, 2004)
Sore wa, Totsuzen, Arashi no you ni... (TBS, 2004)
Wonderful Life (Fuji TV, 2004)
Shin Yonigeya Honpo (NTV, 2003, ep1)
Kikujiro to Saki 2 (TV Asahi, 2005)
Kiken na Aneki (Fuji TV, 2005)
Tsubasa No Oreta Tenshitachi (Fuji TV, 2005, ep4)
Unfair (Fuji TV, 2006)
Dance Drill (Fuji TV, 2006)
Unfair SP (Fuji TV, 2006)
Yakusha Damashii (Fuji TV, 2006)
Kirakira Kenshui (TBS, 2007)
Erai Tokoro ni Totsuide Shimatta! (TV Asahi, 2007)
Kodoku no Kake (TBS, 2007)
Ushi ni Negai wo: Love & Farm (Fuji TV, 2007)
Kikujiro to Saki 3 (TV Asahi, 2007)
SAITOU san (NTV, 2008)
Camouflage Chapter 4: Tomin Suzuko (Wowow, 2008)
Piple (Wowow, 2020)
Come Come Everybody (NHK, 2021–22), Kazuko Takemura

References

External links
Entry on Jdorama.com (picture and filmography in Japanese)

1968 births
Living people
20th-century Japanese actresses
21st-century Japanese actresses
Actors from Kobe
Musicians from Kobe
20th-century Japanese women singers
20th-century Japanese singers